Storm Music is a 1934 novel by the English author Dornford Yates (Cecil William Mercer). It was first serialised in Woman's Journal (December 1933 to April 1934, illustrated by Forster) and Woman's Home Companion (December 1933 to May 1934, under the title Bright With Peril, illustrated by Frederick Chapman).

Plot 
John Spencer (narrator) witnesses the burial of a murdered servant. Spencer identifies the man's employer as Lady Helena, tells her of the murder, and becomes her lover. A criminal gang attempt to steal the gold bullion secreted in the cellar of her home, the castle at Yorick.

Background 
This was another variation on Mercer's old theme of a castle with treasure. Mercer's autobiographer AJ Smithers, writing in 1982, suggested that “the faithful knew what they were buying without bothering to look at it".

Critical reception 
Once again, the critics approved and the novel sold well.

The original dustjacket included the following quotes -

Punch: "Dornford Yates is a clever story-teller, and his skill is cleverly revealed in this adventurous romance."
Sunday Times: "There is no lack of either excitement or mystery in this breathless story."
Times Literary Supplement: "Dornford Yates manifests his abundant ingenuity once more in the opening of an excellent mystery yarn."

References

Bibliography
 

1934 British novels
British thriller novels
Hodder & Stoughton books
Novels by Dornford Yates
Works originally published in Woman's Home Companion